Kristien Dieltiens (born 27 September 1954) is a Flemish author.

Career 

Dieltiens made her debut in 1997 with De gouden bal. For her book Olrac (2000) she won the Prijs van de Kinder- en Jeugdjury Vlaanderen in 2002.

For her 50th book Kelderkind Dieltiens won the Woutertje Pieterse Prijs in 2013. The book draws inspiration from the life of Kaspar Hauser, a German youth who claimed to have grown up in the total isolation of a darkened cell. In 2012, Dieltiens also won the West-Vlaamse Provinciale Prijs Letterkunde for this book and it was also nominated for a Boekenleeuw.

Awards 

 2002: Prijs van de Kinder- en Jeugdjury Vlaanderen, Olrac
 2012: West-Vlaamse Provinciale Prijs Letterkunde, Kelderkind
 2013: Woutertje Pieterse Prijs, Kelderkind
 2014: Kleine Cervantes, Kelderkind

References

External links 
 Kristien Dieltiens (in Dutch), Digital Library for Dutch Literature
 Kristien Dieltiens (in Dutch), jeugdliteratuur.org

1954 births
Living people
Flemish women writers
Woutertje Pieterse Prize winners
20th-century Belgian women writers
21st-century Belgian women writers
Writers from Antwerp